Mulleriyawa South Grama Niladhari Division is a Grama Niladhari Division of the Kolonnawa Divisional Secretariat  of Colombo District  of Western Province, Sri Lanka .  It has Grama Niladhari Division Code 503A.

Mulleriyawa  are located within, nearby or associated with Mulleriyawa South.

Mulleriyawa South is a surrounded by the Belagama, Mulleriyawa North, Himbutana West, Malgama and Malpura  Grama Niladhari Divisions.

Demographics

Ethnicity 

The Mulleriyawa South Grama Niladhari Division has a Sinhalese majority (96.4%) . In comparison, the Kolonnawa Divisional Secretariat (which contains the Mulleriyawa South Grama Niladhari Division) has a Sinhalese majority (67.4%) and a significant Moor population (21.4%)

Religion 

The Mulleriyawa South Grama Niladhari Division has a Buddhist majority (93.8%) . In comparison, the Kolonnawa Divisional Secretariat (which contains the Mulleriyawa South Grama Niladhari Division) has a Buddhist majority (64.6%) and a significant Muslim population (23.1%)

Gallery

References 

Grama Niladhari Divisions of Kolonnawa Divisional Secretariat